Genoplesium baueri, commonly known as the brittle midge orchid, is a small terrestrial orchid which is endemic to New South Wales. It has a single thin leaf and up to nine yellowish green to reddish brown flowers. It is mostly only found in coastal and near-coastal heath and woodland between Port Stephens and Ulladulla.

Description
There is a fleshy, raised, channelled callus in the centre of the labellum. Flowering occurs between December and April and is enhanced by fire the previous summer.<ref name="RBGS">{{cite web|last1=Jones|first1=David|title=Genoplesium fimbriatum|url=http://plantnet.rbgsyd.nsw.gov.au/cgi-bin/NSWfl.pl?page=nswfl&lvl=sp&name=Genoplesium~baueri|publisher=Royal Botanic Garden Sydney|accessdate=28 January 2018}}</ref>

Taxonomy and naming
The brittle leek orchid was first formally described in 1810 by Robert Brown who published the description in Prodromus Florae Novae Hollandiae et Insulae Van Diemen. The specific epithet (baueri) honours Ferdinand Bauer.

Distribution and habitatGenoplesium baueri grows in heath, woodland and forest, mostly in coastal and near-coastal areas. It has been recorded between Port Stephens and Ulladulla and as far inland as Woodford and Penrose State Forest.

Conservation
This midge orchid is only known from about 200 plants in thirteen sites and has been classed as "Endangered" under the New South Wales Threatened Species Conservation Act and the Commonwealth Government Environment Protection and Biodiversity Conservation Act 1999'' (EPBC) Act.

References

baueri
Endemic orchids of Australia
Orchids of New South Wales
Plants described in 1810